The 2003 Solomon Islands National Club Championship was the 1st season of the National Club Championship in the Solomon Islands. Central Realas FC won the inaugural league. All matches were played at the hillside ground called Lawson Tama Stadium, with an approximate capacity of 20,000.

Teams 
 Auki Kingz
 Banika Bulls
 Husa FC
 Koloale FC
 Kuara FC
 Mareeba Bulls
 Senga FC
 TNT FC

Pools

Pool A

Pool B

Knockout stage

Semi-finals

Third place match

Final

References 

Solomon Islands S-League seasons
2003 in Solomon Islands sport